Sir Ralph George Elphinstone Mortimer (7 July 1869 – 3 May 1955) was an English landowner and public servant who had a fleeting career as a first-class cricketer. He was a right-handed batsman who played for Lancashire. He was born in Newcastle upon Tyne, Northumberland and died in Milbourne Hall, near Ponteland, Northumberland.

As a cricketer, Mortimer made just one first-class appearance for Lancashire, in a University match against Oxford University in 1891. In the only innings in which he batted, he scored 22 not out. But he remained a player at a lower level and, representing Northumberland, he played in the Minor Counties Championship from 1896 to 1906; he later served as president and chairman of the cricket club.

Mortimer studied at Harrow School and Trinity College, Cambridge. In 1891, he inherited Milbourne Hall from a maternal relative and thereafter was occupied with good works in the Northumberland area. He was involved from early days with the Boy Scout movement and was chairman or vice-chairman of Newcastle Royal Victoria Infirmary for 36 years; at the age of 72, The Times reported in his obituary, he was involved in more than 50 local committees. He was awarded the OBE in 1920 and knighted in 1934.

References

External links
Ralph Mortimer at Cricket Archive

1869 births
1955 deaths
People educated at Harrow School
Alumni of Trinity College, Cambridge
English cricketers
Lancashire cricketers
Cricketers from Newcastle upon Tyne
Northumberland cricketers
People from Ponteland
Cricketers from Northumberland